Boardroom is an American media network for sports, entertainment and culture. It was founded in 2019 by Kevin Durant and Rich Kleiman.

History
On September 24, 2018, ESPN and Durant announced plans for "The Boardroom", a six-episode series hosted by Kleiman and Jay Williams. The show premiered on February 11, 2019, with guests including LeBron James, P. J. Tucker, Maverick Carter, Andre Iguodala, Jack Dorsey, CJ McCollum and Breanna Stewart.

By 2019, Boardroom became a standalone media network and expanded in 2020 during the coronavirus pandemic, which Kleiman told Forbes was a "pivotal moment" for the company. A second season of "The Boardroom" premiered on ESPN+ on February 12, 2020. Later that year, Boardroom announced the launch of two podcasts, "Out of Office with Rich Kleiman" and "The ETCs with Kevin Durant".

As of June 2022, The Athletic reported that Boardroom was a 25-person company with digital news media, podcasts, video and social content. The network has partnerships with brands such as Weedmaps, Coinbase and FanDuel. In partnership with Showtime, Boardroom produced a documentary, NYC Point Gods, that premiered on July 29, 2022.

References

Internet properties established in 2019
American sport websites
Mass media companies established in 2019
Video production companies
American companies established in 2019